The 2012 Kataller Toyama season saw Kataller Toyama compete in the J.League Division 2 for the fourth consecutive year. Kataller Toyama also competed in the 2012 Emperor's Cup.

Players

Competitions

J. League

League table

Matches

Emperor's Cup

References

Kataller Toyama
Kataller Toyama seasons